Siirt Airport  is an airport in Siirt, the city in Southeastern Anatolian region of Turkey.

Airport is close to Pınarova, Pınarca, Aktaş, Tuzkuyusu, and Köprübaşı villages.

Airlines and destinations

Traffic statistics

References

 

Siirt
Airports in Turkey
Buildings and structures in Siirt Province
Transport in Siirt Province